Roger Green (born 2 June 1943 in Toronto, Ontario) is a Canadian former sailor who competed in the 1968 Summer Olympics.

References

1943 births
Living people
Sportspeople from Toronto
Canadian male sailors (sport)
Olympic sailors of Canada
Sailors at the 1968 Summer Olympics – Flying Dutchman